North Carolina's 25th Senate district is one of 50 districts in the North Carolina Senate. It has been represented by Republican Amy Galey since 2023.

Geography
Since 2023, the district has included all of Alamance County, as well as part of Randolph County. The district overlaps with the 54th, 63rd, 64th, 70th, and 78th state house districts.

District officeholders

Election results

2022

2020

2018

2016

2014

2012

2010

2008

2006

2004

2002

2000

References

North Carolina Senate districts
Alamance County, North Carolina
Randolph County, North Carolina